Kazuya Murata may refer to:

 Kazuya Murata (footballer)
 Kazuya Murata (director)
 Kazuya Murata (baseball)